Making The Grade is Diffuser's second album. It featured the band moving away from the hard rock style on "Injury Loves Melody" to more of a pop punk style similar to Sum 41. The songs "I Wonder" and "Get It On" were used in the 2003 movie Freaky Friday. The song "Get It On" and "New High" also appeared on the soundtracks for the Outlaw Volleyball and NHL Hitz Pro video games, respectively.

It was produced by Mark Trombino, who has worked with bands such as blink-182, Jimmy Eat World, Sugarcult, and Finch.

Track listing

Equipment
Diffuser uses Mesa Boogie amps, Fender basses, Gibson guitars, Ernie Ball strings, Taylor acoustics, Pork Pie drums, Ampeg bass amps, and Bogner amps.

Personnel
Mark Trombino - Producer, Recording, Mixing
Jason Cupp - Assistant Engineer
Dean Nelson - Assistant Engineer
Justin Smith - Assistant Engineer
Dan Certa - Additional ProTools
Brian Gardner - Mastering
Peter Malkin - Management
Enny Joo - Art Direction and Design
Anthony Cangelosi - Art Direction and Design
Justin Stephens - Cover Photo
Debra Herman - Management
Jason Jordan - A+R

References

2003 albums
Albums produced by Mark Trombino
Diffuser (band) albums